The imperial pheasant (Lophura × imperialis) is a gallopheasant from Southeast Asia. Long thought to be an enigmatic and elusive species, it is actually a cross of Edwards's pheasant and the silver pheasant (L. nycthemera subsp. annamensis), a hybrid.

The imperial pheasant is a dark blue, medium-sized, up to 75 cm long pheasant with bare red facial skin, blue crest, crimson legs and glossy plumage. The female is brown with erectile short feather crest, blackish tail and primaries. This pheasant is found in the forests of Vietnam and Laos. Its appearance resembles another of Vietnam's enigmatic birds, the Vietnamese pheasant, but it is larger in size, has a longer tail, and an all dark blue crest and tail feathers. The latter species has a white crest and central tail feathers.

Previously known only from a pair taken alive to Europe by Jean Théodore Delacour in 1923, this species was rediscovered in 1990, when an immature male was trapped by a rattan collector. Another immature male was caught in February 2000.

This rare bird was determined not to be a true species, but a naturally occurring hybrid between the Edwards's pheasant and the subspecies annamensis of the silver pheasant (L. nycthemera).

References

External links 
 Red Data Book

imperial pheasant
Birds of Laos
Birds of Vietnam
imperial pheasant
imperial pheasant
Bird hybrids